Roderick Lamar "Rod" Tolbert (born June 11, 1967) is an American former sprinter.

Athletic Accomplishments: Indoor World Champion 1995

 USA

Jr. Pam Am Games Bronze Medalist 1985

Long Jump

3 Times US Olympic Festival Medalist

1989, 1991, 1993

4 Times NCAA All-American

200m, 

NCAA Runner-Up

1987 

12 Times Big Ten Conference Champion

55m, Long Jump, 100m, 200m,  (1986-1989)

6 Times Maryland State Champion (1985)

55m, 300m, 200m, Long Jump

PERSONAL BEST: 55m 6.19; 60m 6.66; 100m-10.14; 200m-20.38; 300m-32.89;

References

1967 births
Living people
American male sprinters
World Athletics Indoor Championships winners